Ocean Terminal is a common name for passenger terminals and may refer to:

Ocean Terminal, Edinburgh
Ocean Terminal (1950-1980) at Southampton docks, demolished 1983
Ocean Terminal (2009-present) at Southampton docks, opened 2009
Ocean Terminal, Greenock
Ocean Terminal, Hong Kong
Ocean Terminal (film), a British Transport Film